Dodek na froncie is a 1936 Polish comedy film directed by Michał Waszyński.

Cast
Adolf Dymsza ...  Dodek Wedzonka 
Alicja Halama ...  Zofia Majewska 
Mieczysław Cybulski ...  Lt. Jerzy Majewski 
Helena Grossówna ...  Zuzia, the maid 
Michał Znicz ...  Lt. Duszkin 
Józef Orwid ...  Col. Józef Pulkovnik 
Mieczysława Ćwiklińska ...  Putkovnikova 
Władysław Grabowski ...  Grand Duke Vladimir Pavtovich 
Waclaw Zdanowicz ...  Russian Captain 
Stefan Hnydziński ...  Ordonnanz 
Chór Dana ...  Russian soldiers chorus 
Chór Cyganski Sieminowa ...  Gypsy chorus 
Alla Bayanova ...  Gypsy singer (episode)

External links 
 

1936 films
1930s Polish-language films
Polish black-and-white films
Films directed by Michał Waszyński
1936 comedy films
Polish comedy films